Claudia Fortin (born 25 May 1973) is a Honduran swimmer. She competed in six events at the 1992 Summer Olympics.

References

External links
 

1973 births
Living people
Honduran female swimmers
Olympic swimmers of Honduras
Swimmers at the 1992 Summer Olympics
Place of birth missing (living people)
Central American and Caribbean Games gold medalists for Honduras
Central American and Caribbean Games medalists in swimming
Competitors at the 1993 Central American and Caribbean Games